Ivan Vukadinović (born 21 August 1984) is a Serbian former footballer who played as a defender.

References

External links
 
 
 Profile at Srbijafudbal

1984 births
Living people
Footballers from Belgrade
Serbian footballers
Serbian expatriate footballers
Expatriate footballers in Romania
Serbian expatriate sportspeople in Romania
Association football defenders
OFK Beograd players
FK BASK players
RFK Grafičar Beograd players
FK Voždovac players
FK BSK Borča players
CS Gaz Metan Mediaș players
Serbian SuperLiga players
Liga I players